John Bernard Murphy (10 April 1919 – 29 July 1997) was an Australian sports shooter. He competed in the 50 metre rifle, three positions event at the 1964 Summer Olympics.

References

1919 births
1997 deaths
Australian male sport shooters
Olympic shooters of Australia
Shooters at the 1964 Summer Olympics
Sportspeople from Adelaide
Shooters at the 1966 British Empire and Commonwealth Games
Commonwealth Games medallists in shooting
Commonwealth Games bronze medallists for Australia
20th-century Australian people
Medallists at the 1966 British Empire and Commonwealth Games